Bonai is a Vidhan Sabha constituency of Sundargarh district, Odisha.
Area of this constituency includes Bonaigarh block, Gurundia block, Lahunipada block and Koida block.

Elected members

Fifteen elections held during 1951 to 2014. List of members elected from Bonai constituency are:
2019: (14): Laxman Munda (CPM)
2014: (14): Laxman Munda (CPM)
2009: (14): Bhimsen Choudhury (BJP)
2004: (141): Laxman Munda (CPM)
2000: (141): Dayanidhi Kisan (BJP)
1995: (141): Jual Oram (BJP)
1990: (141): Jual Oram (BJP)
1985: (141): Basanta Kumar Singh Dandapat (Congress)
1980: (141): Basanta Kumar Singh Dandapat (Congress)
1977: (141): Hemanta Kumar Singh Dandapat (Janata Party)
1974: (141): Benudhar Nayak (Congress)
1971: (126): Hemanta Prasad Mohapatra (Independent)
1967: (126): Hemanta Prasad Mohapatra (Independent)
1961: (66): Hemendra Prasad Mohapatra (Ganatantra Parishad)
1957: (45): Arjuna Nayak (Gana Parishad) 
1951: (39): Nilamani Singh Dandapat (Gana Parishad)

2019 Election Result
In 2019 election Communist Party of India (Marxist) candidate Laxman Munda defeated Biju Janata Dal candidate Ranjit Kishan, by 12,030 votes.

2014 election result
In 2014 election Communist Party of India (Marxist) candidate Laxman Munda defeated Biju Janata Dal candidate Dayanidhi Kisan by 1,818 votes.

2009 election result
In 2009 election Bharatiya Janata Party candidate Bhimsen Choudhury, defeated Communist Party of India (Marxist) candidate Laxman Munda by 3,356 votes.

1957 election result

1952 election result

Notes

References

Sundergarh district
Assembly constituencies of Odisha